Vallas is a surname. Notable people with the surname include:

Léon Vallas (1879–1956), musicologist and biographer
Alexander Max(imilian) Vallas (1884– ca. 1943), Austrian illustrator and poet 
Jean-Louis Vallas (1901–1995), French poet
Paul Vallas (born 1953), American school administrator
Spyros Vallas (born 1981), Greek football player